Bomgadah located at 31°25′02″S 141°44′53″ is a remote civil parish of Mootwingee County in far North West New South Wales.

Geography
The Geography, of the Parish is mostly the flat, arid scrubland. The parish has a Köppen climate classification of BWh (Hot desert). The nearest town is Broken Hill, New South Wales. The Parish is on the Silver City Highway, Tibooburra is to the north and Whitecliffs to the east.

The Parish is on the traditional lands of the Bandjigali peoples Aboriginal peoples.

References

Parishes of Mootwingee County
Far West (New South Wales)